Ellen Buckingham Mathews (1849–1920) was a popular female English novelist during the late 19th and early 20th centuries. She was also known as Mrs Reeves after her marriage in 1877 to Dr. Henry Albert Reeves (1841–1914) but was best known under her pen name, Helen Mathers. She was born in Misterton, Somerset. Her first novel, "Comin' thro' the Rye" was published in 1875. It was partly based on people in her life and on her own early romantic experiences. She also acknowledged Rhoda Broughton as an early influence. She continued to write until her death.

She was educated at a boarding school in  Chantry near Frome in Somerset. In her first novel, "Comin' thro' the Rye" she describes some of her experiences at school. "Mr Russell" in the novel was the Rev. Mr. Fussell in real life, who was the Lord of the manor and founder of the school. In the novel she calls the village Charteris. From 1875 to 1895 the novel sold over 35,000 copies.

Due to a confusion of titles, some sources attribute a number of books by Scottish novelist Anne S. Swan to Mathers. Mathers published a short novel entitled "Land o' the Leal, by the Author of Comin' Thro' the Rye" in 1878. Swan published "The Land o' the Leal" using her male pseudonym David Lyall, in 1896. Conflating the two different novels with the same title has led some people to assume (erroneously) that David Lyall is Mathers's pseudonym. It is not.


Bibliography 
Comin’ Thro' the Rye, 1875
The Token of the Silver Lily, 1877. Poetry
Cherry Ripe!: A Romance, 1878
Land o' the Leal, 1878
As He Comes up the Stair, 1878
My Lady Greensleeves, 1879
Story of a Sin, 1882
Eyre's Acquittal, 1883
Sam's Sweetheart, 1883
Jock o' Hazelgreen, 1884 (also contains "The Land o' the Leal" and other stories)
Found Out: A Story, 1885
Murder or Manslaughter, 1885
The Fashion of this World, 1886
Blind Justice, 1890
The Mystery of No 13, 1891
My Jo, John: A Novel, 1891
T'other Dear Charmer, 1892
The Fate of Fenella, 1892. Mathers contributed one chapter to this multi-author novel.
A Study of a Woman, 1893
What the Glass Told, 1893
A Man of Today, 1894
The Lovely Malincourt: A Novel, 1895
The Rebel, 1896
The Juggler and the Soul, 1896
The Sin of Hagar, 1896
Bam Wildfire: A Character Sketch, 1898
Becky, 1900
Cinders: A Novel, 1901
Honey, 1902
Venus Victrix (What the Glass Told; The Mystery of No. 13; What the Glass Told; My Jo, John), 1902
Dahlia and Other Stories, 1903
Dimples, 1903
Griff of Griffithscourt, 1903
The Face in the Mirror and Other Stories, 1903
The New Lady Teazle and other stories, 1903
Side-shows, 1904
The Ferryman, 1905
Tally, Ho!, 1906
Pigskin and Petticoat, 1907
The Pirouette and Other Stories (2nd edition, 1907)
Gay Lawless, 1908
Love the Thief, 1909
Man is Fire, Woman is Tow and Other Stories, 1912

References

Sources

External links 
 
 
 

1853 births
1920 deaths
English women novelists
19th-century English writers
Victorian novelists
Victorian women writers
19th-century English women writers
20th-century English women writers
20th-century English writers